Kenneth L. Hanson (born 1953) is an associate professor in the University of Central Florida Judaic Studies Program, at the University of Central Florida, in Orlando, Florida. Dr. Hanson has authored books on the Dead Sea Scrolls, Kabbalah and lost books of the Bible. He is a regular contributor on the History Channel, and has also appeared on the radio show Coast to Coast AM as a guest numerous times.

References

External links
 

Dead Sea Scrolls
Judaic scholars
Kabbalah
University of Central Florida faculty
Living people
1953 births